Chirag Jani is an Indian actor who has appeared in Telugu, Tamil, Gujarati and Hindi language films. He made his acting debut in the Hindi serial Sapne Suhane Ladakpan Ke, along with Vaishnavi Mahant, directed by Rajesh Babbar and produced by Shyamashish Bhattacharya. His performances in many films were applauded, especially in Yahan Ameena Bikti Hai, directed by Kumar Raj. Chirag played as Sindhura in the devotional TV show Vighnaharta Ganesha. He has also acted in television series like  Porus (as the Dasyu King Arunayak) and Dastaan-E-Mohabbat Salim Anarkali (as Mirza Muhammad Hakim).

Chirag has recently appeared as the villain in Kaappaan, an action thriller directed by K. V. Anand. He starred in the Gujarati film G.

Filmography

Television 
 Sapne Suhane Ladakpan Ke  as Jagan (2013)
 Porus as Dasyu king Arunayak (2017–2018)
 Vighnaharta Ganesha as Sindhura  (2018)
 Dastaan-E-Mohabbat Salim Anarkali  as Hakim Mirza (2018)

References

Living people
Indian male film actors
Indian male television actors
Male actors in Hindi television
Male actors in Hindi cinema
20th-century Indian male actors
21st-century Indian male actors
1987 births